Special Correspondents (Italian: Inviati speciali) is a 1943 Italian romantic thriller film directed by Romolo Marcellini and starring Dorothea Wieck, Otello Toso and Maurizio D'Ancora. It was produced as a propaganda film in support of the Italian war effort during the Second World War, released a few months before the overthrow of Benito Mussolini's regime.

It was shot at the Farnesina Studios of Titanus in Rome. The film's sets were designed by the art directors Alberto Boccianti and Camillo Del Signore.

Synopsis
During the Spanish Civil War an Italian journalist meets a woman he takes to be a colleague, but is in fact a Communist agent. They encounter each other years later during the North African Campaign, where she has a change of heart and heroically sacrifices herself.

Cast
 Dorothea Wieck as Lidia Warren
 Otello Toso as Renato Marini
 Maurizio D'Ancora as L'operatore Galletti
 Nerio Bernardi as Il maggiore Alessandri
 Mino Doro as Il giornalista Prosperi
 Francesco Grandjacquet as Il commissario Michele Kuncef
 Carlo Duse as L'ufficiale di Stato Maggiore in Africa
 Barbara Ledi as Barbara Wood
 Luigi Pavese as Un colonnello
 Piero Palermini as Il giovane tenente
 Emilio Petacci as Richardson
 Otello Cazzola as De Gariata
 Mario Brizzolari as Il colonnello Garcia
 Maria Teresa Le Beau as L'informatrice
 Rita Livesi as La direttrice dell' hotel a Biarritz
 Paolo Ferrara as Baldassare
 Adele Garavaglia as La signora del telegrafo
 Saro Urzì as Un soldato

References

Bibliography 
 Trubiano, Marisa S. Ennio Flaiano and His Italy: Postcards from a Changing World. Fairleigh Dickinson Univ Press, 2010.

External links 
 

1943 films
1943 war films
1940s Italian-language films
Films directed by Romolo Marcellini
Italian black-and-white films
Spanish Civil War films
Films set in the 1930s
Films set in the 1940s
Films set in Egypt
World War II films made in wartime
1940s Italian films